Stanislav Todorov (Bulgarian: Станислав Тодоров; born 7 September 1976) is a Bulgarian international referee who has refereed 2014 FIFA World Cup qualifiers.

References

1976 births
Living people
Bulgarian football referees